The following people participated in The Great British Bake Off, which premiered on BBC Two in 2010, then moved to BBC One in 2014, and then moved to Channel 4 in 2017. The Star Baker award was introduced in the second series (2011).

BBC series (2010–2016)
All information is accurate as of the time the series was filmed.

Channel 4 series (2017–present)
All information is accurate as of the time the series was filmed.

See also
 List of The Great British Bake Off finalists
 List of The Great British Bake Off Star Bakers

References
General

 
 
 
 
 
 
 
 
 
 
 
 
 
 
 
 
 
 

Specific

Contestants